Dukuvakha Bashtayevich Abdurakhmanov (March 14, 1956 — June 29, 2015) was a Russian politician. He was Chairman of the Parliament of the Chechen Republic from 2005 to 2015.

References

1956 births
2015 deaths
People from Karaganda
Recipients of the Order of Honour (Russia)
Recipients of the Order of Friendship (South Ossetia)
United Russia politicians